Madrigal is the name of a form of poetry, the exact nature of which has never been decided in English.

The definition given in the New English Dictionary, "a short lyrical poem of amatory character," offers no distinctive formula; some madrigals are long, and many have nothing whatever to do with love. The most important English collection of madrigals, not set to music, was published by William Drummond of Hawthornden (1585–1649) in his Poems of 1616. Perhaps the best way of ascertaining what was looked upon in the 17th century as a madrigal is to quote one of Drummond's:

This may be taken as a type of Drummond's madrigals, of which he has left us about eighty. They are serious, brief, irregular lyrics, in which neither the amatory nor the complimentary tone is by any means obligatory. Some of these pieces contain as few as six lines, one as many as fourteen, but they average from nine to eleven. In the majority of examples the little poem opens with a line of six syllables, and no line extends beyond ten syllables. The madrigal appears to be a short canzone of the Tuscan type, but less rigidly constructed. In French the madrigal has not this Italian character. It is simply a short piece of verse, ingenious in its turn and of a gallant tendency. The idea of compliment is essential. J. F. Guichard (1730–1811) writes: "Orgon, poke marital, A Venus compare sa femme; C'est pour la belle un madrigal, C'est pour Venus une epigramme."

This quatrain emphasizes the fact that in French a madrigal is a trifling piece of erotic compliment, neatly turned but not seriously meant. The credit of inventing the old French verse form of madrigal belongs to Clément Marot, and one of his may be quoted in contrast to that of Drummond:

In English, when the word first occurred — it has not been traced farther back than 1588 (in the preface to Nicholas Yonge's Musica transalpina) — it was identified with the chief form of secular vocal music in the 16th century. In 1741, John Immyns (1700–1764) founded the Madrigal Society, which met in an ale-house in Bride Lane, Fleet Street; this association still exists, and is the oldest musical society in Europe.

The word "madrigal" is frequently also used to designate a sentimental or trifling expression in a half-contemptuous sense.

Notes

References
 

Western medieval lyric forms